The 2022 NCAA Division I FBS football season was the 153rd season of college football in the United States organized by the National Collegiate Athletic Association (NCAA) at its highest level of competition, the Football Bowl Subdivision (FBS). The regular season began on August 27 and ended on December 10. The postseason began on December 16, and, aside from any all-star games that are scheduled, ended on January 9, 2023, with the College Football Playoff National Championship at SoFi Stadium in Inglewood, California. The Georgia Bulldogs successfully defended their national championship when they defeated the TCU Horned Frogs, 65–7. It was the first time in the College Football Playoff era that a team won back-to-back championships. This was the ninth season of the College Football Playoff (CFP) system.

Rule changes
The following rule changes were approved by the NCAA Playing Rules Oversight Panel for the 2022 season.

 In games featuring instant replay, when players are disqualified for a targeting call in the second half or in overtime (which requires a carryover penalty of sitting out the first half of the next scheduled game), an appeal process will be available to allow the National Coordinator of Officials to review tapes of the targeting penalty for consideration of not requiring the player to sit out the first half of the following game.
 Injury timeouts awarded due to "deceptive actions" during a game will also be able to be reviewed by the National Coordinator of Officials to determine what sanctions, if any, against teams who use this tactic, enforced at the conference or school level.
 Blocking below the waist will only be permitted inside the tackle box by linemen and stationary backs. Blocks below the waist outside of the tackle box are not allowed.
 The penalty for players who commit illegal blocks or contact after a signal for a fair catch is changed from 15-yards to 10-yards, and is no longer considered a personal foul.
 Defensive holding will remain a 10-yard penalty but will now always carry an automatic first down.  Previously automatic first downs on defensive holding were awarded if the quarterback attempted a pass.
 Codifying the rule change made shortly after the 2021 ACC Championship Game, ball carriers who simulate a feet-first slide will be declared down at that spot.  This rule has informally been referred to as the "Kenny Pickett Rule".
 Defensive players who commit unsportsmanlike conduct penalties during a pass or run play will have the 15-yard penalty enforced from the end of the run/pass like a personal foul penalty.
 Uniform rules were changed to require the sock/leg covering to go from the shoe to the bottom of the pants, similar to the NFL rule.  Not required
 Illegal touching (intentional) of a forward pass by an ineligible receiver now includes a loss of down penalty in addition to the yardage (5-yards).

Other headlines
 March 1 – The Sun Belt Conference released its 2022 football schedule. Notably, the schedule included Marshall, Old Dominion, and Southern Miss, schools that had announced their departure from Conference USA and were then in a dispute with C-USA regarding their departure date, with Marshall having sued C-USA. The SBC release did not mention the dispute or the possibility that the three schools would not be able to join for the 2022 season.
 March 29 – C-USA and the three aforementioned schools reached a settlement that allowed said schools to join the SBC in July 2022.
 May 18 – The NCAA Division I Council voted to approve multiple changes to football administrative rules. Among these changes:
 Restrictions on how conferences determine which teams qualify for their conference title games were removed. The Pac-12 Conference was the first conference to scrap its divisions for the 2022 season. While it will continue its division-based scheduling model for that season, it announced that it would consider other models for future seasons.
 All annual signing limits were removed for the 2022–23 and 2023–24 academic years. Only the overall scholarship limits (85 players receiving athletically related financial aid throughout D-I football, with 63 full scholarship equivalents in FCS) remain in place for those seasons.
 A win over an FCS team will count toward bowl eligibility if the FCS team awards at least 80% of that subdivision's limit of 63 scholarship equivalents over a two-year rolling period, down from the previous 90%. This made permanent a change that the NCAA had made on an ad hoc basis in 2020.
 The council made permanent a set of criteria, originally established on an ad hoc basis in 2020, for filling bowl slots in seasons when the number of bowl slots is greater than the number of teams with .500 records.
 May 20 – The Mountain West Conference announced that it would eliminate its football divisions starting with the 2023 season.
 June 10 – The American Athletic Conference and the three schools set to depart from that league (Cincinnati, Houston, UCF) announced that they had reached a buyout agreement that will allow those schools to join the Big 12 Conference in 2023.
 June 16 – The American confirmed the 2023 entry date for the six schools scheduled to join that league from Conference USA—Charlotte, Florida Atlantic, North Texas, Rice, UAB, and UTSA.
 June 28 – The ACC approved a new football schedule format after the May 18 NCAA ruling. Starting in 2023, the conference will abandon its divisional model in favor of a "3–5–5" format in which each team plays 3 permanent rivals and 5 other conference teams each season, with the non-permanent opponents rotating so that each team will play every other conference member at least once home and once away in a four-year cycle. Under this format, the championship game will feature the top two teams in the conference standings.
 June 30 – The Big Ten Conference announced that UCLA and USC would join from the Pac-12 Conference in 2024, immediately after the current Pac-12 media contracts expire.
 August 18 – The Big Ten announced a new all-sports media rights deal, running from 2023 to 2030, with Fox, CBS, and NBC that will provide the conference a reported $7 billion. By the end of the deal, each of the 16 members (including 2024 arrivals UCLA and USC) will receive as much as $100 million annually.
 August 31 – The Division I Board of Directors adopted a series of changes to transfer rules.
 Transfer windows were adopted for all Division I sports. Student-athletes who wish to be immediately eligible at their next school must enter the NCAA transfer portal within the designated period(s) for their sport. For football, two windows were established: a 45-day window starting with the day after championship selections are made (in FBS, the College Football Playoff), and a spring window from May 1–15. Accommodations will be made for participants in the College Football Playoff National Championship.
 Student-athletes who experience head coaching changes, or those whose athletic aid is reduced, canceled, or not renewed, may transfer outside designated windows without penalty.
 Transferring student-athletes will be guaranteed their financial aid at their next school through graduation.
 September 2 – The Board of Managers of the College Football Playoff voted to expand the playoff from four teams to twelve teams starting in 2026, but encouraged CFP's commissioners to implement by 2024. The model is similar to the one discussed in 2021; the six highest rated conference champions plus six at-large teams would make up the playoff.
 October 14 – Conference USA announced that Kennesaw State, currently a member of the FCS ASUN Conference, would start a transition to FBS after the 2022 football season and join C-USA in 2024.
 October 19 – Mississippi State announced that freshman offensive lineman Sam Westmoreland had died two days before his 19th birthday. The cause of death was being investigated, but foul play was not suspected.
 October 21 – San Jose State freshman running back Camdan McWright was killed when he was struck by a school bus while riding an electric scooter near the university campus. The Spartans' scheduled game for the next day against New Mexico State was postponed and will be made up later in the season.
October 26 - The Big Ten Conference released its 2023 schedules and retained the divisional alignment.  The conference is expected to eliminate divisions once USC and UCLA join in 2024.
 November 5 – SMU defeated Houston 77–63, with the two teams combining for a new FBS record of 140 points in regulation. The previous record of 137 had been set when Pittsburgh defeated Syracuse 76–61 in 2016. SMU quarterback Tanner Mordecai also set school and American Athletic Conference records with 9 touchdown passes, and tied an FBS record for touchdown passes in a half with 7 in the first half.
 November 12 – Carlton Martial of Troy recorded his 546th tackle to break the Division I FBS record for most tackles in a career.
 November 13 – Three Virginia players—junior receivers Devin Chandler and Lavel Davis Jr., and junior edge rusher D'Sean Perry—were killed in a mass shooting in a parking garage on UVA's campus in Charlottesville. Junior running back Mike Hollins and another UVA student were wounded in the incident, which took place as a group of students was returning from a class field trip. Another student on the trip, former Cavaliers running back Christopher Jones Jr., was arrested the next day on multiple felony charges, including three counts of second-degree murder.
 November 16 – In the wake of the on-campus shooting three days earlier, Virginia canceled its final home game of the season against Coastal Carolina.
 November 17 – During a meeting in San Francisco, the Regents of the University of California, the governing board of the University of California system, set a date of December 14 for a special meeting to make a final determination on UCLA's planned move to the Big Ten.
 November 21 – Virginia and Virginia Tech agreed to cancel their rivalry game, originally set for November 26, in the wake of the UVA shooting. Both teams had already been eliminated from bowl eligibility.
 November 30 - The Rose Bowl signed an agreement to expand the College Football Playoff to 12 teams, clearing the way to begin the new playoff structure starting in 2024.
 December 11 – Mississippi State coach Mike Leach had been hospitalized from a personal issue.
 December 12 – Mike Leach in the evening had passed away “from complications due to a heart condition”.
December 14 - The UC Regents approved UCLA's move to the Big Ten. Additionally, conditions were made to mitigate athletes such as investing $12 million in beneficial services including nutritional support and charter flights to reduce travel time.  UCLA must also pay the University of California, Berkeley an additional $2 to $10 million due to the move affecting the latter's athletic program, with the precise total being made once the Pac-12 completes its upcoming media rights deal.

Conference realignment

One team played its first FBS season in 2022. James Madison started a transition from Division I FCS in 2022, joining the Sun Belt Conference. As a full Sun Belt member, it met FBS scheduling requirements in the 2022 season, allowing it to be counted as an FBS opponent for scheduling purposes and to skip the first year of the normal two-year transition process.

Three other teams joined the Sun Belt from Conference USA in 2022. Marshall, Old Dominion, and Southern Miss, while initially reported to be making said move in 2023, announced their intent to move in 2022. C-USA had insisted that all three were bound to that league through the 2022–23 school year. Following a brief legal dispute, the parties reached a settlement allowing the schools to leave at the end of June.

The 2022 season was the last for 12 FBS teams in their current conferences or as FBS independents:

In addition to James Madison, two other FCS teams started transitions to FBS in the 2022 season. They will not join their future FBS conferences until 2023.
 Jacksonville State will leave the ASUN Conference for C-USA. 
 Sam Houston will leave the Western Athletic Conference for C-USA.

Stadiums
This was the first season for San Diego State at Snapdragon Stadium, replacing the since-demolished San Diego Stadium after playing at Dignity Health Sports Park in Carson for two seasons in 2020 and 2021. The Aztecs played their first game in the new stadium against the Arizona Wildcats on September 3, 2022.

Kickoff games
Rankings reflect the AP Poll entering each week.

"Week Zero"
The regular season began on Saturday, August 27 with eleven games in Week 0.

Aer Lingus College Football Classic (Aviva Stadium, Dublin, Ireland): Northwestern 31, Nebraska 28 
Florida State 47, Duquesne 7
North Carolina 56, Florida A&M 24 
Illinois 38, Wyoming 6
Vanderbilt 63, Hawaii 10
Western Kentucky 38, Austin Peay 27
UNLV 52, Idaho State 21
Nevada 23, New Mexico State 12
Utah State 31, UConn 20
Florida Atlantic 43, Charlotte 13
North Texas 31, UTEP 13

Week 1
The majority (85%) of FBS teams opened the season on Labor Day weekend. Three neutral-site "kickoff" games were held.

Chick-fil-A Kickoff: 
 No. 3 Georgia 49, No. 11 Oregon 3 (at Mercedes-Benz Stadium, Atlanta, GA)
No. 4 Clemson 41, Georgia Tech 10 (at Mercedes-Benz Stadium, Atlanta, GA)
 Louisiana Kickoff:
 Florida State 24, LSU 23 (at Caesars Superdome, New Orleans, LA)

Top 10 matchups
Rankings through Week 9 reflect the AP Poll. Rankings for Week 10 and beyond will list College Football Playoff Rankings first and AP Poll second. Teams that failed to be a top 10 team for one poll or the other will be noted.

Regular season
Week 1
No. 2 Ohio State defeated No. 5 Notre Dame, 21–10 (Ohio Stadium, Columbus, OH)
Week 5
No. 5 Clemson defeated No. 10 NC State, 30–20 (Memorial Stadium, Clemson, SC)
Week 7
No. 6 Tennessee defeated No. 3 Alabama, 52–49 (Neyland Stadium, Knoxville, TN)
No. 5 Michigan defeated No. 10 Penn State, 41–17 (Michigan Stadium, Ann Arbor, MI)
Week 8
No. 10 Oregon defeated No. 9 UCLA, 45–30 (Autzen Stadium, Eugene, OR)
Week 10
No. 3/1 Georgia defeated No. 1/2т Tennessee, 27–13 (Sanford Stadium, Athens, GA)
No. 10/15 LSU defeated No. 6/6 Alabama, 32–31 OT (Tiger Stadium, Baton Rouge, LA)
Week 13
No. 3/3 Michigan defeated No. 2/2 Ohio State, 45–23 (Ohio Stadium, Columbus, OH)
Week 14
No. 10/13 Kansas State defeated No. 3/3 TCU, 31–28 OT (2022 Big 12 Championship Game, AT&T Stadium, Arlington, TX)

Bowl games
Orange Bowl
No. 6 Tennessee defeated No. 7 Clemson, 31–14 (Hard Rock Stadium, Miami Gardens, FL)
Sugar Bowl
No. 5 Alabama defeated No. 9 Kansas State, 45–20 (Caesars Superdome, New Orleans, LA)
Fiesta Bowl (CFB Playoff semifinal)
No. 3 TCU defeated No. 2 Michigan, 51–45 (State Farm Stadium, Glendale, AZ)
Peach Bowl (CFB Playoff semifinal)
No. 1 Georgia defeated No. 4 Ohio State, 42–41 (Mercedes Benz Stadium, Atlanta, GA)
National Championship
No. 1 Georgia defeated No. 3 TCU, 65-7 (SoFi Stadium, Inglewood, CA)

FCS team wins over FBS teams

Upsets
This section lists instances of unranked teams defeating AP Poll-ranked teams during the season.

Regular season
So far during the regular season, unranked FBS teams have defeated ranked FBS teams 44 times.
 
September 3, 2022
Florida 29, No. 7 Utah 26
September 10, 2022
Appalachian State 17, No. 6 Texas A&M 14
Marshall 26, No. 8 Notre Dame 21
Washington State 17, No. 19 Wisconsin 14
Texas Tech 33, No. 25 Houston 30 2OT
September 17, 2022
Washington 39, No. 11 Michigan State 28
September 24, 2022
Kansas State 41, No. 6 Oklahoma 34
Texas Tech 37, No. 22 Texas 34 OT
Middle Tennessee 45, No. 25 Miami (FL) 31
September 30, 2022
UCLA 40, No. 15 Washington 32
October 1, 2022
Mississippi State 42, No. 17 Texas A&M 24
TCU 55, No. 18 Oklahoma 24
Purdue 20, No. 21 Minnesota 10
Georgia Tech 26, No. 24 Pittsburgh 21
October 8, 2022
South Carolina 24, No. 13 Kentucky 14
Notre Dame 28, No. 16 BYU 20
Arizona State 45, No. 21 Washington 38
October 15, 2022
Oklahoma 52, No. 19 Kansas 42
Georgia Southern 45, No. 25 James Madison 38
October 22, 2022
LSU 45, No. 7 Ole Miss 20
October 29, 2022
Louisville 48, No. 10 Wake Forest 21
Notre Dame 41, No. 16 Syracuse 24
UCF 25, No. 20 Cincinnati 21
Missouri 23, No. 25 South Carolina 10
November 4, 2022
Washington 24, No. 24 Oregon State 21
November 5, 2022
Notre Dame 35, No. 5 Clemson 14
Texas 34, No. 13 Kansas State 27
Michigan State 23, No. 14 Illinois 15
Kansas 37, No. 18 Oklahoma State 16
Pittsburgh 19, No. 22 Syracuse 9
November 12, 2022
Arizona 34, No. 9 UCLA 28
Boston College 21, No. 17 NC State 20
UConn 36, No. 19 Liberty 33
Purdue 31, No. 21 Illinois 24
November 19, 2022
South Carolina 63, No. 5 Tennessee 38
Georgia Tech 21, No. 13 North Carolina 17
Arkansas 42, No. 14 Ole Miss 27
Navy 17, No. 17 UCF 14
Oklahoma 28, No. 24 Oklahoma State 13
November 24, 2022
Mississippi State 24, No. 20 Ole Miss 22
November 25, 2022
NC State 30, No. 18 North Carolina 27 2OT
November 26, 2022
Texas A&M 38, No. 6 LSU 23
South Carolina 31, No. 7 Clemson 30
James Madison 47, No. 23 Coastal Carolina 7

Bowl games
Rankings in this section are based on the final CFP rankings released on December 4, 2022.

December 30, 2022
Pittsburgh 37, No. 18 UCLA 35 (Sun Bowl)
Maryland 16, No. 23 NC State 12 (Duke's Mayo Bowl)

Conference standings

Rankings

The top 25 from the AP and USA Today Coaches Polls.

Pre-season polls

CFB Playoff final rankings
On December 4, 2022, the College Football Playoff selection committee announced its final team rankings for the year.

Final rankings

Conference summaries
Rankings in this section are based CFP rankings released prior to the games.

Conference champions' bowl games
Ranks are per the final CFP rankings, released on December 4, 2022, with win–loss records at that time.

CFP College Football Playoff participant

Postseason

There are 41 team-competitive FBS post-season bowl games, with two teams advancing to a 42nd – the CFP National Championship game. Normally, a team is required to have a .500 minimum winning percentage during the regular season to become bowl-eligible (six wins for an 11- or 12-game schedule, and seven wins for a 13-game schedule). If there are not enough winning teams to fulfill all open bowl slots, teams with losing records may be chosen to fill all 82 bowl slots. Additionally, on the rare occasion in which a conference champion does not meet eligibility requirements, they are usually still chosen for bowl games via tie-ins for their conference.

Bowl game changes: 
 The Bahamas Bowl is now sponsored by HomeTown Lenders.
 The game formerly known as the Outback Bowl was renamed as the ReliaQuest Bowl, following the end of sponsorship by Outback Steakhouse. 
 The Cure Bowl is now sponsored by Duluth Trading Company.
 The Fiesta Bowl is now sponsored by Vrbo.
 The Pinstripe Bowl is now sponsored by Bad Boy Mowers.
The Citrus Bowl is now sponsored by Kellogg's through its Cheez-It brand.
The Frisco Football Classic will not be taking place this year, as it was a temporary replacement to accommodate all 84 bowl-eligible teams.

Bowl-eligible teams
ACC (9): Clemson, Duke, Florida State, Louisville, NC State, North Carolina, Pittsburgh, Syracuse, Wake Forest
American (7): Cincinnati, East Carolina, Houston, Memphis, SMU, Tulane, UCF
Big Ten (9): Illinois, Iowa, Maryland, Michigan, Minnesota, Ohio State, Penn State, Purdue, Wisconsin
Big 12 (8): Baylor, Kansas, Kansas State, Oklahoma, Oklahoma State, TCU, Texas, Texas Tech
C-USA (6): Middle Tennessee, North Texas, Rice, UAB, UTSA, Western Kentucky
MAC (6): Bowling Green, Buffalo, Eastern Michigan, Miami (OH), Ohio, Toledo 
Mountain West (7): Air Force, Boise State, Fresno State, San Diego State, San Jose State, Utah State, Wyoming
Pac-12 (7): Oregon, Oregon State, UCLA, USC, Utah, Washington, Washington State
SEC (11): Alabama, Arkansas, Florida, Georgia, Kentucky, LSU, Mississippi State, Missouri, Ole Miss, South Carolina, Tennessee
Sun Belt (7): Coastal Carolina, Georgia Southern, Louisiana, Marshall, South Alabama, Southern Miss, Troy
Independent (5): BYU, Liberty, Notre Dame, UConn, New Mexico State 

Number of bowl berths available: 82Number of bowl-eligible teams: 80Number of conditional bowl-eligible teams: 1 (New Mexico State) 
Number of teams qualified by APR: 1 (Rice)

Bowl-ineligible teams 
ACC (5): Boston College, Georgia Tech, Miami (FL), Virginia, Virginia Tech
American (4): Navy, South Florida, Temple, Tulsa 
Big Ten (5): Indiana, Michigan State, Nebraska, Northwestern, Rutgers
Big 12 (2): Iowa State, West Virginia
C-USA (5): Charlotte, FIU, Florida Atlantic, Louisiana Tech, UTEP
MAC (6): Akron, Ball State, Central Michigan, Kent State, Northern Illinois, Western Michigan
Mountain West (5): Colorado State, Hawaii, Nevada, New Mexico, UNLV
Pac-12 (5): Arizona, Arizona State, California, Colorado, Stanford
SEC (3): Auburn, Texas A&M, Vanderbilt 
Sun Belt (7): Appalachian State, Arkansas State, Georgia State, James Madison, Louisiana–Monroe, Old Dominion, Texas State
Independent (2): Army, UMass

Number of bowl-ineligible teams: 49

College Football Playoff

Conference performance in bowl games

All-star games
Each of these games features college seniors, or players whose college football eligibility is ending, who are individually invited by game organizers. These games are scheduled to follow the team-competitive bowls, to allow players selected from bowl teams to participate. The all-star games may include some players from non-FBS programs.

Awards and honors

Heisman Trophy
The Heisman Trophy is given to the year's most outstanding player.

 Caleb Williams, QB, USC
 Max Duggan, QB, TCU
 C. J. Stroud, QB, Ohio State
 Stetson Bennett, QB, Georgia

Other overall
 AP Player of the Year: Caleb Williams, QB, USC
 Lombardi Award (top player): Will Anderson Jr., LB, Alabama 
 Maxwell Award (top player): Caleb Williams, QB, USC
 SN Player of the Year: Caleb Williams, QB, USC
 Walter Camp Award (top player): Caleb Williams, QB, USC

Special overall
 Burlsworth Trophy (top player who began as walk-on): Stetson Bennett, QB, Georgia
 Paul Hornung Award (most versatile player): Jack Colletto, LB, Oregon State
 Jon Cornish Trophy (top Canadian player): Chase Brown, RB, Illinois
 Campbell Trophy ("academic Heisman"): Jack Campbell, LB, Iowa
 Academic All-American of the Year: Will Levis, QB, Kentucky
 Wuerffel Trophy (humanitarian-athlete): Dillan Gibbons, OL, Florida State

The Senior CLASS Award, honoring the outstanding senior student-athlete in several NCAA Division I sports, including football, has gone on hiatus. On September 13, 2022, the award operator, Premier Sports Management, announced that it would not present the award until it picks up a new corporate sponsor.

Offense
Quarterback
 Davey O'Brien Award: Max Duggan, TCU
 Johnny Unitas Golden Arm Award (senior/4th year quarterback): Max Duggan, TCU 
 Manning Award: Stetson Bennett, Georgia 

Running back
 Doak Walker Award: Bijan Robinson, RB, Texas

All receivers
 Fred Biletnikoff Award: Jalin Hyatt, WR, Tennessee

Tight end
 John Mackey Award: Brock Bowers, TE, Georgia

Lineman:
Rimington Trophy (center):  Olusegun Oluwatimi, C, Michigan
Outland Trophy (interior lineman on either offense or defense): Olusegun Oluwatimi, C, Michigan
Joe Moore Award (offensive line): Michigan

Defense
 Bronko Nagurski Trophy (defensive player): Will Anderson Jr., LB, Alabama
 Chuck Bednarik Award (defensive player): Will Anderson Jr., LB, Alabama 
 Lott Trophy (defensive impact): Will Anderson Jr., LB, Alabama

Defensive front
 Dick Butkus Award (linebacker): Jack Campbell, LB, Iowa
 Ted Hendricks Award (defensive end): Caleb Murphy, Ferris State

Defensive back
 Jim Thorpe Award: Tre'Vius Hodges-Tomlinson, CB, TCU

Special teams
 Lou Groza Award (placekicker): Christopher Dunn, NC State
 Ray Guy Award (punter): Adam Korsak, Rutgers
 Jet Award (return specialist): Derius Davis, TCU
 Patrick Mannelly Award (long snapper): Chris Stoll, Penn State
 Peter Mortell Holder of the Year Award: Noah White, Louisiana Tech

Coaches
 AFCA Coach of the Year: Sonny Dykes, TCU
 AP Coach of the Year: Sonny Dykes, TCU
 Bobby Dodd Coach of the Year: Willie Fritz, Tulane
 Eddie Robinson Coach of the Year: Sonny Dykes, TCU
 George Munger Award: Willie Fritz, Tulane
 Home Depot Coach of the Year: Sonny Dykes, TCU
 Paul "Bear" Bryant Award: Sonny Dykes, TCU
 Walter Camp Coach of the Year: Sonny Dykes, TCU

Assistants
 AFCA Assistant Coach of the Year: Mike Tressel, DC/LB, Cincinnati
 Broyles Award: Garrett Riley, OC/QB, TCU

All-Americans

Coaching changes

Preseason and in-season
This is restricted to coaching changes taking place on or after May 1, 2022, and will include any changes announced after a team's last regularly scheduled game but before its bowl game. For coaching changes that occurred earlier in 2022, see 2021 NCAA Division I FBS end-of-season coaching changes.

End of season
This list includes coaching changes announced during the season that did not take effect until the end of the season.

Television viewers and ratings

Most watched regular season games

Conference championship games

Notes

Most watched non-CFP bowl games

New Year Six and College Football Playoff semifinal games

See also
 2022 NCAA Division I FCS football season
 2022 NCAA Division II football season
 2022 NCAA Division III football season
 2022 NAIA football season

References